Giorgi Parpalia (born 21 June 1986) is a retired Georgian football defender. He played for Zorya Luhansk 2, Desna Chernihiv and Kolkheti Khobi.

Club career
Parpalia, started his career in Zorya Luhansk 2. In 2008 he moved to Desna Chernihiv in Ukrainian First League and in the season 2008–09, he got 7 place with the team and where he played in the match against Obolon Kyiv, replacing Oleksandr Hrebieniuk in the second half. In 2011 he moved to Kolkheti Khobi a team in Georgia. Here he played 25 caps and he scored 3 goals. 5 December 2012, he played also in the match against Tskhinvali where lost 2–1.

References

External links

Video of giorgi parpalia
Video of giorgi parpalia with Desna

1986 births
Living people
Soviet footballers
Footballers from Georgia (country)
FC Desna Chernihiv players
FC Kolkheti Khobi players
Ukrainian First League players
Expatriate footballers from Georgia (country)
Expatriate footballers in Ukraine
Expatriate sportspeople from Georgia (country) in Ukraine
Association football defenders